John Henry Lake (born July 27, 1877, date of death unknown) was an American racing cyclist who competed in the late 19th century and early 20th century. He was born in Port Richmond, Staten Island. He participated in Cycling at the 1900 Summer Olympics in Paris and won the equivalent of the modern bronze medal in the men's 2 km sprint. (The current gold-silver-bronze medal format was introduced in 1904.) He also competed in the 25 km race, but did not finish.

In 1900 Lake invented a machine that allowed him to ride his bike on a stand that, with the help of a partner, would grind the blades of skates.

References

External links
 

1877 births
Year of death missing
American male cyclists
Olympic bronze medalists for the United States in cycling
Cyclists at the 1900 Summer Olympics
Sportspeople from Staten Island
Medalists at the 1900 Summer Olympics
Place of death missing
Cyclists from New York (state)